Jean-Éric Vergne (born 25 April 1990), also known as JEV, is a French racing driver who competes in the FIA Formula E Championship with DS Penske. He became the 2017–18 ABB Formula E Champion, after clinching fifth in the New York ePrix in 2018, and he became the first Formula E driver to win two consecutive championships after his repeat success in the 2018–19 season. He competed in Formula One for Scuderia Toro Rosso from 2012 to 2014, and was a Ferrari test and development driver from 2015 to 2016. He won the British Formula 3 Championship in 2010 and then finished runner up to teammate Robert Wickens in the 2011 Formula Renault 3.5 Series season.

Early career

Karting
Born in Pontoise, France, Vergne started competing in karting at age 4 at his dad's kart circuit near Paris. He entered his first competition in 2000 and became French champion in the "kids" ("Minimes") category in 2001. Three years later, he became runner–up in the French Rotax Max championship. In 2005, he finished as runner-up in the ICA class of the European Championship, behind James Calado, with the highlight of his karting career coming the following year when he finished seventh in the premier KF1 World Championship, held at Angerville, another track near Paris.

Formula Renault 1.6 and 2.0
In 2007, Vergne moved up to single-seater racing, joining the French Formula Renault Campus series which he won comfortably at the first attempt, taking ten podium places from thirteen races in the process. Vergne became a member of both the renowned Red Bull Junior Team and the French Automobile Sport Federation (FFSA), at the conclusion of the 2007 season.

The following season, Vergne competed in both the Eurocup Formula Renault 2.0 and Formula Renault 2.0 West European Cup championships for SG Formula. He finished sixth in the Eurocup standings, taking nine points scoring positions in fourteen races, including a podium in the final race of the season at Barcelona. In the West European Cup, he took fourth place in the championship, scoring three podium places.

In both series, he finished as the highest placed rookie driver, and in addition, he also won the French Formula Renault 2.0 title, which was awarded to the best French driver in the West European Cup standings.

For 2009, Vergne remained in both championships with SG Formula. He finished second behind Spain's Albert Costa in both the Eurocup, and the WEC.

Formula Three
2010 saw Vergne move to the British Formula 3 Championship, competing for multiple champions Carlin. He took 12 victories from the first 24 races, including a clean sweep of three victories at the Spa-Francorchamps round. This was enough to give him the title with six races remaining in the season. It was the third consecutive year that a driver from the Red Bull Junior Team had won the title with Carlin, following on from Jaime Alguersuari in 2008 and Daniel Ricciardo in 2009.

During the season, Vergne also contested the two main non-championship Formula Three races, the Masters of Formula 3 at Zandvoort, where he finished just off the podium in fourth, and the Macau Grand Prix where he finished in seventh position. On both occasions he was also the highest placed finisher from the British series.

GP3 Series
In May 2010, Vergne was signed by Tech 1 Racing to contest the opening GP3 Series round in Barcelona. He was replaced by countryman Jim Pla for the next round in Turkey as it clashed dates with the British Formula 3 event at Hockenheim, but returned to the team for the following round in Valencia. However, in early July it was announced that Daniel Juncadella would take Vergne's seat at the team for the remainder of the season.

Formula Renault 3.5 Series

Along with his Formula Three campaign, Vergne had been due to compete in the Formula Renault 3.5 Series for SG Formula. However, SG Formula pulled out a week before the first race, meaning that Vergne could concentrate on his Formula Three campaign.

In July 2010, it was announced that Vergne would replace Brendon Hartley at Tech 1 Racing for the final three events of the season after Hartley was released by the Red Bull Junior Team. Despite only taking part in those meetings, Vergne finished 8th in the championship with four podium places, including his first series win at Silverstone after original race winner Esteban Guerrieri was disqualified for a technical infringement.

Vergne graduated to the series full-time in 2011, switching from Tech 1 Racing to Carlin. After winning the second race at the Monza round in May, Vergne was given a time penalty and demoted to third place after he was adjudged to have cut a chicane in order to maintain the lead of the race. However, after an appeal by his Carlin team, the Italian Motorsports Commission (CSAI) overturned the penalty and reinstated Vergne to the victory.

Going into the final round of the season in Barcelona, Vergne trailed series leader and teammate Robert Wickens by two points, having taken five race victories including a double win at the Hungaroring. In the final race of the season, Wickens and Vergne collided on the opening lap, sending Wickens into retirement. Although Vergne was able to continue, he was later taken out of the race by Mofaz Racing's Fairuz Fauzy, handing the title to Wickens by just nine points.

Formula One

Vergne had his first outing in a Formula One car at the Goodwood Festival of Speed in July 2010, driving a Red Bull RB5. In September 2010, it was announced that he would drive for Toro Rosso in the post-season young driver test to be held at the Yas Marina Circuit in November, with the team later confirming that he would drive the Toro Rosso STR5 for both days of the test. On the first day of the test he set the seventh fastest time with a lap of 1:42.489, completing 93 laps in the process.

On the second day of the test, Vergne finished ninth fastest with a lap time of 1:40.974, just 0.030 seconds behind the Williams of new GP2 champion Pastor Maldonado. As well as suffering an engine-related issue which limited his running, he also had to leave the test early to travel to Macau for the end-of-season Formula Three race.

In November 2011, Vergne tested the title-winning Red Bull RB7 at the young driver test in Abu Dhabi, setting the fastest lap time on all three days.

Toro Rosso (2012–2014)

2012 season 

On 14 December 2011, it was officially confirmed that Vergne would race for Toro Rosso in the  season, alongside fellow Red Bull Junior Team member Daniel Ricciardo. After qualifying and finishing in eleventh place at the season-opening , Vergne scored his first World Championship points at the following race in Malaysia by finishing eighth in a rain-affected race. In the  he turned into the car of Heikki Kovalainen from outside of the racing line during an overtake attempt, damaging both cars severely and scattering enough debris on the track that the safety car had to be deployed. After the race the stewards found that the accident had been avoidable and that Vergne had caused the accident.

This also proved to be his first race retirement in Formula One as he had finished consistently at the previous seven races on the schedule. Vergne finished the season in 17th in the Drivers' Championship with 16 points, the total being accrued with four eighth-place finishes. Despite not scoring points as frequently as Daniel Ricciardo, he finished the season ahead of Ricciardo.

2013 season 

The rest of the season was a nightmare with a highest finish of 12th with three retirements, finishing the final race in 15th place and 15th in the standings with a total of 13 points while Daniel Ricciardo outshone him to earn 20 points.

2014 season 
It was announced in 2013 that Vergne would drive again for Toro Rosso alongside rookie, 19-year-old Daniil Kvyat, who replaced Ricciardo at the team. Vergne qualified well in the season opener in Australia in sixth place beating champions Kimi Räikkönen, Sebastian Vettel and Jenson Button and he finished the race just ahead of his teammate in ninth, however after Daniel Ricciardo was disqualified, he moved up to eighth place. In Malaysia he qualified ninth but did not finish the race after getting a poor start and colliding with the Marussia and Caterham while his rookie teammate Kvyat finished tenth. Vergne then retired again in the following race in Bahrain. Vergne again had a poor start and finished in 12th place while Kvyat scored again in tenth place.

A wheel was not properly fitted in Friday practice ending his session early and earning him a 10 place grid penalty. As a result, he started from 21st position, only ahead of Pastor Maldonado who crashed in Q1. Vergne got off to a decent start getting through the Marussias and Caterhams while pulling away from Maldonado, but he retired for the third time in five races due to technical problems. In the following race at Silverstone, Vergne was able to get in to Q3 for the 6th time, finishing the race in 10th. In Hungary, Vergne qualified eighth in changing conditions, but in the race he managed to get as high as second after pitting after a safety car; he held position in front of a battle which included Nico Rosberg, Sebastian Vettel and Lewis Hamilton. However, after his second stop he dropped back to eventually finish in ninth place.

In Japan, Vergne finished 9th in worsening wet conditions despite starting 20th on the grid. At the start of the race, Vergne climbed to fifth and pulled a move around the outside of Kevin Magnussen at turn three on the third lap. However, Vergne slowly dropped back, finishing 13th, directly ahead of Kvyat.

However, after Sebastian Vettel left Red Bull, it was announced that Kvyat would replace him, leaving a possible seat for Vergne at Toro Rosso for 2015. On 26 November 2014 however, Vergne announced that he would be leaving Toro Rosso for 2015, and Carlos Sainz Jr would replace him.

Test driver at Ferrari (2015–2016) 
On 19 December 2014, it was announced that Vergne would join Ferrari in 2015, as test and development driver particularly in respect of simulator work. He left Ferrari in February 2017.

Formula E

Andretti Autosport (2014–2015)

2014-15 season 
After being unable to secure a full-time drive for the 2015 Formula One season, he switched to the FIA Formula E Championship and signed for Andretti Autosport. Vergne made his debut in the third race of the season in Uruguay and secured pole position. Vergne was overtaken at the start by Nelson Piquet Jr., and he retook the lead on lap 12. After the pit stops Vergne conceded the lead to Sébastien Buemi, but he attacked Buemi until retiring due to a broken suspension two laps before the end of the race. He achieved his first podium in Long Beach, finishing second behind race winner Piquet. He finished third in the first race at the London ePrix, passing Piquet and Lucas di Grassi in the process. In the second race, he finished 16th after receiving a drive-through penalty. He ultimately finished seventh in the final championship standings, with 70 points.

DS Virgin Racing (2015–2016)

2015-16 season 

On 8 August 2015, it was announced that Vergne would join the DS Virgin Racing team for the 2015–16 Formula E season, partnering Sam Bird. Vergne struggled to compete with Bird and finished ninth in the championship.

Techeetah (2016–2022)

2016-17 season 
In July 2016, it was announced Vergne would compete with the newly formed Techeetah, following their acquisition of Team Aguri. Vergne went on to score the first podiums, fastest lap award and the team's first win at the 2016–17 season finale in Montréal.

2017-18 season 
Vergne was confirmed to continue with the team in the 2017–18 season.
He scored his second win at the 2018 Santiago ePrix, and achieved his third win in his Formula E career at the 2018 Punta del Este ePrix. After stringing together a consistent run of points finishes, Vergne clinched the title with a race to spare in New York, becoming the fourth different driver's champion in four seasons.

2018-19 season 
For the 2018–19 season Vergne stayed with Techeetah and won 3 races in Sanya, Monaco and Bern. He also became champion for the second year in a row, becoming Formula E's first repeat champion.

2019-20 season 
It was announced that in the 2019–20 season, Vergne would be racing alongside António Félix da Costa, who would replace the TAG Heuer Porsche Formula E Team bound André Lotterer (who was his teammate from 2017 to 2019). After two points finishes and two retirements, Vergne scored his first podium finish in Marrakesh despite missing FP1 due to a fever. Super GT and Super Formula veteran James Rossiter took his place during FP1. After a brief hiatus to the season due to the COVID-19 pandemic, Vergne scored two podium finishes in two of the six rounds in the Berlin, finishing third in round three, and scoring his first victory of the season in round four. He would ultimately finish third in the championship standings, just one point behind Stoffel Vandoorne.

2020-21 season 
Vergne remained with DS Techeetah for the 2020-21 season. Vergne failed to score in Diriyah and won the first race in rome, leaving Italy with 25 points after 4 races. Vergne failed to finish in the first race in Puebla after being squeezed into the wall after activating attack mode. Vergne took second in New York on day 1 but remained in the 24th slot on the grid after the lights went out the next day, giving him his second DNF. Vergne again failed to score in London and finished the season in 10th with 80 points, 19 behind De Vries who won the championship.

2021-22 season 

Vergne stayed with DS Techeetah for a sixth straight season. Vergne got 12 points from Diriyah and took 3rd in Mexico. His 2 poles were in the second race in Rome and Jakarta, finishing second in both to Mitch Evans and scored 2 more podium in Monaco and Berlin inbetween. Vergne had a DNF in both second races in New York and London, Both from contact. Vergne finished 6th in both races in Seoul which meant he finished the season in 4th with 144 points.

DS Penske (2023–)

2022-23 season 
In October 2022, it was announced that Vergne would be joining the newly formed DS Penske outfit alongside reigning champion Stoffel Vandoorne for the 2023 season. The season started out with disappointing rounds in Mexico City and Diriyah, with the Frenchman only taking points in one of the three races. In an unexpected manner however, Vergne bounced back at the inaugural Hyderabad ePrix, where he scored his first victory of the season, defending from a hard-charging Nick Cassidy during the final sequence of laps. He would come close to the top step at the next round in Cape Town, where an audacious overtake from former teammate da Costa relegated Vergne to second by the checkered flag.

World Endurance Championship
Vergne signed with the Peugeot factory team to compete at the 2022 FIA World Endurance Championship at the Hypercar class.

Personal life
In 2018, Vergne signed a partnership with Veloce Esports. They became the co-founders of Veloce Racing, a racing team currently part of Extreme E.

Vergne plays the piano. In addition to his native French, Vergne also speaks English, Italian, and Spanish. He considers André Lotterer, his teammate from 2017 to 2019, a close friend.

Racing record

Career summary

* Season still in progress.

Complete Eurocup Formula Renault 2.0 results
(key) (Races in bold indicate pole position) (Races in italics indicate fastest lap)

Complete British Formula 3 International Series results 
(key) (Races in bold indicate pole position; races in italics indicate fastest lap)

Complete GP3 Series results
(key) (Races in bold indicate pole position; races in italics indicate fastest lap)

Complete Formula Renault 3.5 Series results
(key) (Races in bold indicate pole position; races in italics indicate fastest lap)

Complete Formula One results
(key) (Races in bold indicate pole position; races in italics indicate fastest lap)

† Driver did not finish the Grand Prix, but was classified as he completed over 90% of the race distance.

Complete Formula E results
(key) (Races in bold indicate pole position; races in italics indicate fastest lap)

† Driver did not finish the race, but was classified as he completed over 90% of the race distance.

Complete FIA World Endurance Championship results
(key) (Races in bold indicate pole position; races in italics indicate fastest lap)

* Season still in progress.

Complete 24 Hours of Le Mans results

Complete European Le Mans Series results
(key) (Races in bold indicate pole position; races in italics indicate fastest lap)

‡ Half points awarded as less than 75% of race distance was completed.

References

External links

 
 
 
 

1990 births
Living people
Sportspeople from Pontoise
French racing drivers
Karting World Championship drivers
French Formula Renault 2.0 drivers
Formula Renault 2.0 WEC drivers
Formula Renault Eurocup drivers
British Formula Three Championship drivers
French GP3 Series drivers
World Series Formula V8 3.5 drivers
French Formula One drivers
Toro Rosso Formula One drivers
Formula E drivers
Formula E Champions
24 Hours of Le Mans drivers
FIA World Endurance Championship drivers
24H Series drivers
SG Formula drivers
Carlin racing drivers
Tech 1 Racing drivers
Andretti Autosport drivers
Envision Virgin Racing drivers
Techeetah drivers
Manor Motorsport drivers
G-Drive Racing drivers
European Le Mans Series drivers
Peugeot Sport drivers
Formule Campus Renault Elf drivers
La Filière drivers
TDS Racing drivers